= Ditlev Engel =

Danish businessman

Ditlev Engel is a Danish businessman noted for his executive roles in alternative energy companies. Engel was formerly the head of Vestas Wind Systems' as the world's largest wind-turbine maker. Engel is the current CEO of the Business Area Energy Systems.

== Education ==
Engel was born on 24 May 1964, in Fredericksberg. He attended the Kildegaard Gymnasium in 1983 before studying an hhx, an upper secondary education focused on the mercantile field, for one year at Niels Brock. In 1990, Engel obtained his diploma in Business Economics from the Copenhagen Business School. He also completed the General Management Programme at INSEAD in 1997.

== Career ==
In 1990, Engel became the vice-president of Hempel Hong Kong Ltd., a Chinese joint- venture of Hempel, which was a Danish company engaged in the manufacture of industrial paint. He served in this capacity until 1995, when he became the president of Hempel Norge. He was assigned to Hempel Hai Hong Ltd. (China) in the same capacity in 1997 until he became the Group President and chief executive of Hempel in 2000. When he became the chief executive of the whole company, he was only 35 years old. He held this post until 2005, the year he left for Vestas Wind Systems to assume its president and chief executive positions.

Engel is credited for steering Vestas System to become the most sold wind turbine in the world. However, due to the 2008 financial crisis, Engel was ultimately ousted from his position.

Engel is currently the CEO of business area Energy Systems at DNV.
